The 2019–20 Northern Colorado Bears men's basketball team represented the University of Northern Colorado during the 2019–20 NCAA Division I men's basketball season. The Bears were led by fourth-year head coach Jeff Linder and played their home games at Bank of Colorado Arena in Greeley, Colorado as members of the Big Sky Conference. They finished the season 22–9, 15–5 Big Sky play to finish in second place. Due to the ongoing coronavirus pandemic, all postseason tournaments were canceled including the Big Sky tournament.

On March 17, 2020, head coach Jeff Lindor was named the head coach at Wyoming. A few days later, the school promoted assistant coach Steve Smiley as the school's new head coach.

Previous season
The Bears finished the 2018–19 season 21–11, 15–5 in Big Sky play to finish in second place. They lost in the quarterfinals of the Big Sky tournament to Southern Utah.

Roster

Schedule and results

|-
!colspan=9 style=|Non-conference regular season

|-
!colspan=9 style=| Big Sky regular season

|-
!colspan=9 style=| Big Sky tournament
|-
!colspan=9 style=|Canceled
|-

Source

References

Northern Colorado Bears men's basketball seasons
Northern Colorado
Northern Colorado Bears men's basketball
Northern Colorado Bears men's basketball